The Best Is Yet to Come: The Songs of Cy Coleman is a compilation album and tribute to Cy Coleman, released in September 2009. The album peaked at number 32 of Billboard Jazz Albums chart.

Track listing
 "The Best Is Yet to Come" - Patty Griffin (3:44)
 "I've Got Your Number" - Jill Sobule (2:29)
 "Why Try to Change Me Now" - Fiona Apple (5:16)
 "I Live My Love" - Madeleine Peyroux (3:01)
 "Then Was Then and Now Is Now" - Ambrosia Parsley (6:03)
 "I'm Gonna Laugh You Right out of My Life" - Julianna Raye (4:09)
 "You Fascinate Me So" - Sam Phillips (5:11)
 "Hey Look Me Over" - Perla Batalla (2:51)
 "Too Many Tomorrows" - Sara Watkins (3:55)
 "I Walk a Little Faster" - Fiona Apple (5:12)	
 "Where Am I Going?" - Sarabeth Tucek (3:54)
 "The Rules of the Road" - Nikka Costa (3:34)
 "(I'm) In Love Again" - Missy Higgins (4:22)

Track listing adapted from Allmusic.

References

2009 compilation albums
Cy Coleman tribute albums